Louis Whirter (also Louis Weierter or Louis Weirter; 1873, Edinburgh – 12 January 1932, Onslow Gardens, South Kensington) was a Scottish artist, etcher, illustrator and inventor who also designed posters for the Underground Group over the period 1931 to 1932.

Quotes about Whirter
"He was an original member of the Scottish Society of Artists and exhibited at the Royal Academy, the Paris Salon and other exhibitions in many parts of the world. Of his war pictures, The Battle of Courcelette was bought for the national collection at Ottawa. Peronne is also at Ottawa, and War in the Air is in the British War Museum." — The ART NEWS: Vol 30, no 19, 2/6/1932

Publications
The Story Of Edinburgh Castle

Gallery

References

External links
 

1873 births
1932 deaths
19th-century Scottish painters
Scottish male painters
20th-century Scottish painters
19th-century Scottish male artists
20th-century Scottish male artists